Asiohahnia is a genus of Asian dwarf sheet spiders that was first described by S. V. Ovtchinnikov in 1992.

Species
 it contains eight species:
Asiohahnia alatavica Ovtchinnikov, 1992 (type) – Kazakhstan, Kyrgyzstan
Asiohahnia dzhungarica Ovtchinnikov, 1992 – Kazakhstan
Asiohahnia ketmenica Ovtchinnikov, 1992 – Kazakhstan
Asiohahnia liangdangensis (Tang, Yang & Kim, 1996) – China
Asiohahnia longipes Ovtchinnikov, 1992 – Kyrgyzstan
Asiohahnia reniformis (Chen, Yan & Yin, 2009) – China
Asiohahnia spinulata Ovtchinnikov, 1992 – Kyrgyzstan
Asiohahnia xinjiangensis (Wang & Liang, 1989) – China

References

Araneomorphae genera
Hahniidae
Spiders of Asia